Rubén Arroyo Lloret (born 22 November 1983) is a Spanish professional footballer who plays for CD Móstoles as a forward.

References

External links
 
 
 

1983 births
Living people
Footballers from Madrid
Spanish footballers
Association football forwards
Segunda División B players
Tercera División players
Real Madrid C footballers
Real Madrid Castilla footballers
Universidad de Las Palmas CF footballers
CF Fuenlabrada footballers
CD Lugo players
SD Eibar footballers
CD Guadalajara (Spain) footballers
CD Toledo players
Arandina CF players
Cypriot First Division players
Ethnikos Achna FC players
Spanish expatriate footballers
Expatriate footballers in Cyprus